"Still in Love with You" is a song originally recorded by Thin Lizzy. The studio version was first released on their 1974 album Nightlife, and went on to be a live favourite, showcasing the guitarists, including Brian Robertson, Scott Gorham, Gary Moore and John Sykes. Live versions were released on the albums Live and Dangerous, Life, BBC Radio One Live in Concert, The Peel Sessions and One Night Only.

Composition
The studio version was recorded at Saturn Sound Studios, Worthing, West Sussex in March 1974, with Phil Lynott on vocals and bass, Gary Moore on guitar and Brian Downey on drums. Moore later said the song was a combination of two pieces; Lynott's "Still in Love With You" with his "I'll Help You See It Through", which he had been working on for some years. Moore left the band the following month, and the song ended up being credited on Nightlife to Lynott alone.

"Still in Love with You" was one of the demos that secured the group's contract with Phonogram Records in summer 1974, by which time Moore had been replaced by guitarists Brian Robertson and Scott Gorham. Manager Chris O'Donnell later said he lied to the Phonogram representatives, saying Robertson (then aged 17) played the solo instead of Moore. The group returned to Saturn Sound in October to add overdubs.

On his video, Still in Love with the Blues, Robertson described the song as "a slow blues".

Live and later versions
Originally, the song was a duet between Lynott and Moore (as can be heard on an early BBC session recording), but following Moore's departure Scottish singer Frankie Miller was recruited to replace his vocal parts. However, Robertson refused to similarly re-record Moore's guitar solo, believing that it could not be improved upon. Despite this, Robertson would go on to consider "Still in Love with You" his signature song, and would not let it be removed from the band's setlist. The song was featured as a set-closer in the band's live shows and became a showcase for each of the band's subsequent guitarists, including Moore (who rejoined and replaced Robertson) and John Sykes, featuring in their live set until the band split in 1983.

The song is usually played in the key of A minor but Thin Lizzy often down-tuned half a step when playing live for a heavier live sound, as is the case for the double live album, Live and Dangerous, making the actual key a concert pitch A flat minor.

Live versions of the song were also released as the b-side of the "Thunder and Lightning" single in April 1983, and as one of four tracks on the 12" release of "Dedication" in 1991. A re-recording appeared as a B-side to the "Out in the Fields" double single and 12" by Gary Moore and Phil Lynott in 1985.

After Lynott's death, the touring version of Thin Lizzy performed the song as a duet in 2011–12, with vocals shared between keyboard player Darren Wharton and frontman Ricky Warwick.

Reception
Allmusic's review of the song says it "is widely considered to be Thin Lizzy's greatest, most romantic ballad."

The Live and Dangerous performance was described by Mark Putterford as the highlight of Lynott's musical career.

Cover versions

Bobby Tench

A cover of this song was recorded by Bobby Tench, and released on the Stiff label in 1986. This version features Thin Lizzy guitarist Brian Robertson and the B side is entitled "Heart Out of Love" which was co-written by Peter Bardens and Tench.

Curt Smith 
The first solo album of Curt Smith after leaving Tears for Fears, entitled Soul on Board, closes with a cover of the song. Curt explained that Lynott was a big influence on him, being a bass player and singer. Additionally, an acoustic version was released on the b-side of his single Words.

Sade

British R&B/soul band Sade covered the song on their 2011 compilation album The Ultimate Collection. It was released as the first single from the album and was included on the Sade Live Tour setlist. In Europe, it was released as a promo single along with another song from the album titled "Love Is Found".

Sade's cover of the song received a positive reception from critics upon its release. Billboard described Sade's cover as "one of the group's finest unreleased treasures" in its review of the single. Andy Kellman of AllMusic Guide called the song "The best of the new songs" from the new compilation.

Charts (Sade's version)

References
Citations

Sources

External links
[ Still in Love with You] at AllMusic

1974 songs
1986 singles
2011 singles
Rock ballads
Thin Lizzy songs
Songs written by Phil Lynott
Sade (band) songs
Vertigo Records singles
Song recordings produced by Ron Nevison
Contemporary R&B ballads
Blues songs